Murder in Harlem (also released as Lem Hawkins Confession and Brand of Cain) is a 1935 American race film written, produced and directed by Oscar Micheaux, who also appears in the film. He remade his 1921 silent film The Gunsaulus Mystery.

Basing the works on the 1913 trial of Leo Frank for the murder of Mary Phagan, Micheaux used the detective genre to introduce different voices and conflicting accounts by his characters. In July 2021, the film was shown in the Cannes Classics section at the 2021 Cannes Film Festival.

Plot 
An African-American man is framed of the murder of a white woman, but a white man is found to be responsible. Author-turned-attorney Henry Glory is hired by the accused man's sister to defend him.  Glory pieces the crime together, and the white killer is revealed.

Cast 
Clarence Brooks as Henry Glory
Dorothy Van Engle as Claudia Vance
 Andrew S. Bishop as Anthony Brisbane
Alec Lovejoy as Lem Hawkins
Laura Bowman as Mrs. Epps
Bee Freeman as The Catbird
Alice B. Russell as Mrs. Vance
Eunice Wilson as Singer
Lorenzo McClane as Arthur Vance
 David Hanna as Undetermined Role
"Slick" Chester as Detective

Soundtrack 
"Harlem Rhythm Dance" (Music and lyrics by Clarence Williams)
"Ants in My Pants" (Music and lyrics by Clarence Williams)

See also
 List of films in the public domain in the United States

References

External links 

1935 films
1935 drama films
1930s mystery drama films
American black-and-white films
Films based on American novels
Films directed by Oscar Micheaux
Films set in Harlem
Race films
Sound film remakes of silent films
Remakes of American films
American mystery drama films
1930s English-language films
1930s American films